Józef Landau (Born in 1875, died in November 1933) was a poet, essayist, philosopher, educational activist, assimilationist, a leading representative of the movement of freethought.

Member and promoter of the progressives united in the Association of Commercial Employees of the Jews in Warsaw. Since 1921 board member of the main Polish Association of Free Thinkers and chief editor of "Free Thought" (1923–1924) and "Free Life". Delegate to the International Congress of Free Thought in Paris (1925) and Luxembourg (1929). The founder of the Warsaw Circle intellectuals since the 1930 editor and publisher of the press organ – Rationalist.

Author of sketches of anti-religious (Warsaw: Polish Association of Free Thinkers, 1923).

References

External links 
 Zarys dziejów ruchu wolnomyślicielskiego w II RP

Polish poets
Jewish American atheists
Jewish philosophers
Jewish poets
1875 births
1933 deaths

20th-century Polish philosophers
Polish atheists